Abacetus aterrimus is a species of ground beetle in the subfamily Pterostichinae. It was described by Peringuey in 1896 and is an endemic species found in South Africa.

References

aterrimus
Beetles described in 1896
Insects of Southern Africa